is a Japanese popular musician, singer-songwriter and actor.

Life and career 

Son of mid-twentieth century film star Ken Uehara, and actress Yoko Kozakura, (ja) Kayama graduated from Keio University. Yuzo Kayama signed with Toho and made his film debut with Otoko tai Otoko directed by Senkichi Taniguchi in 1960. He was cast in the leading role in the 1960 film Dokuritsu Gurentai Nishie directed by Kihachi Okamoto. Kayama rose to stardom in the 1960s in the Wakadaishō ("Young Guy") film series.

He showed his ability for drama when Akira Kurosawa cast him for his films Sanjuro and Red Beard. In the 1970s, he starred such television dramas as Edo no Kaze and Daitsuiseki.

As a guitarist, he took inspiration from the American instrumental group The Ventures, and performed a form of psychedelic surf music in the 1960s with his Mosrite guitar. One of his best-known instrumentals is "Black Sand Beach". "Kimi to Itsumademo" ("Love Forever"), another of his compositions, sold over two million copies, and was awarded a gold disc in 1965. At that point it was the biggest selling disc in the Japanese recording industry's history.

In March 2016, Kayama made a special art piece to commemorate 2,500,000 million downloads for the mobile game Terra Battle, that is featured as the background for the game's title screen.

He announced that, by the end of 2022, he would be retiring from concert activities. One of the last activities involves the song  "Sarai" (ja), which he had written together with singer-songwriter Shinji Tanimura. The song was made as theme for the NTV charity program 24-Hr TV, and Kayama announced that 2022's edition of the program would be his last live performance of the song.

Filmography

Films

Television

Family tree

Honours
Order of the Rising Sun, 4th Class, Gold Rays with Rosette (2014)
Person of Cultural Merit (2021)

References

External links

Japanese male film actors
Japanese male singers
Japanese guitarists
1937 births
Living people
Keio University alumni
Musicians from Kanagawa Prefecture
People from Chigasaki, Kanagawa
Dreamusic artists
Recipients of the Order of the Rising Sun, 4th class
Persons of Cultural Merit